is a 1996 Japanese kaiju film directed by Okihiro Yoneda, with special effects by Kōichi Kawakita. Produced and distributed by Toho Co., Ltd, the film serves as a reboot for the fictional giant monster character Mothra, and is the first installment in the Rebirth of Mothra trilogy. It was the final kaiju film produced under the supervision of Tomoyuki Tanaka, who produced such films as the original Mothra, which was released in 1961, as well as every film in the Godzilla franchise up to this point. He died of a stroke several months after the film's release.

Rebirth of Mothra stars Sayaka Yamaguchi, Megumi Kobayashi, Aki Hano, and Kazuki Futami. It was released theatrically in Japan on December 14, 1996, and was followed by Rebirth of Mothra II the following year, which was then followed by Rebirth of Mothra III in 1998.

Plot
Millions of years before time, a giant three-headed space dragon called Desghidorah arrives on Earth and battles a species of enormous and highly advanced moths who serve as protectors of the "Elias", a race of tiny, humanoid beings. After the battle, Desghidorah is defeated and sealed under the Earth while three Elias, the benevolent Moll and Lora and the vengeful Belvera, and one moth, Mothra, remain. To preserve her species, Mothra lays an egg in 1996, which leaves her physically exhausted.

Shortly after, a logging company uncovers Desghidorah's subterranean prison and inadvertently break the seal containing him. One of the workers, Yuichi Goto, takes the seal home and gives it to his young daughter Wakaba as a souvenir. Taking advantage, Belvera controls her and makes her torture her brother Taiki. Moll, Lora, and a smaller Mothra named Fairy battle Belvera for control of the artifact, though Belvera prevails and releases Desghidorah to help her destroy humanity before they can destroy her race. As the dragon drains the environment's lifeforce, Mothra is summoned to fight it despite her condition. Amidst the battle, Mothra's larva, Mothra Leo, senses his mother's deteriorating strength and hatches prematurely to help her. Though his energized silk seems to turn the tide of battle, Desghidorah bites Leo and drains his energy. Desperate, Mothra airlifts her son to safety and lures her ancient adversary to a dam to keep it at bay. After lowering her son into the sea, Mothra collapses from her age, wounds, and weariness and sinks to her death. The distraught Leo attempts to save his mother, but to no avail.

Angered, the young moth creates a cocoon and begins to metamorphose while Desghidorah goes on a rampage. Having befriended Taiki and Wakaba, Moll and Lora encourage them not to lose hope. Soon, Leo emerges as a swarm of multi-colored butterflies before coalescing into his adult form and taking to the air to confront Desghidorah. Arriving in a hail of energy beams and fueled by righteous fury, Leo relentlessly blasts the three-headed monster, who is unable to defend itself. Drawing upon an ancient legacy, Leo eventually renews the seal that originally bound Desghidorah, defeating him. After restoring a blasted region the dragon destroyed during its assault, Leo travels to his ancestral home as Moll and Lora thank the children for helping them and return home to Infant Island with Fairy while Belvera escapes.

Cast
 Sayaka Yamaguchi as 
 Megumi Kobayashi as  
 Aki Hano as 
 Kazuki Futami as 
 Maya Fujisawa as 
 Kenjiro Nashimoto as 
 Hitomi Takahashi as 
 Mizuho Yoshida as 

A photograph of Ishirō Honda appears in the Goto home.

Release
Rebirth of Mothra was released in Japan on December 14, 1996 where it was distributed by Toho. It was followed up with a sequel the following year with Rebirth of Mothra II.

Box office

Home media
Rebirth of Mothra was released directly to video in the United States. It was released with an English dub by Columbia TriStar Home Video on August 3, 1999. It was released on DVD on February 1, 2000 as a double feature with Rebirth of Mothra II. Both films were only available with an English-dub. A triple feature of all three Rebirth of Mothra films was released on Blu-ray by Sony Pictures Home Entertainment on September 9, 2014 with both the Japanese and English voice tracks. In November 2017, Toho released the Rebirth of Mothra trilogy on Blu-ray in Japan.

See also
List of Japanese films of 1996

References

Bibliography

External links

Rebirth of Mothra at the Japanese Movie Database

1996 films
1990s monster movies
1996 fantasy films
Environmental films
Films about dragons
Films directed by Okihiro Yoneda
Films set in 1997
Films set in Hokkaido
Films set in Kagoshima Prefecture
Films set on fictional islands
Giant monster films
1990s Japanese-language films
Japanese children's films
Kaiju films
Mothra
Films scored by Toshiyuki Watanabe
Films about mother–son relationships
1990s Japanese films